Scutellaria barbata, the barbed skullcap, is a species of flowering plant in the mint family, Lamiaceae. It is native to Asia.

Description 
It is a perennial herb generally reaching up to 35 centimeters tall, sometimes taller. The lightly toothed leaves are somewhat lance-shaped or triangular and up to about 3 centimeters long. The flowers are borne on pedicels that have tiny, sharp bracteoles. The purple-blue, lightly hairy flower corolla is roughly a centimeter long. The plant grows in moist and wet habitat, such as paddy fields.

Distribution 
The herb grows on the flat-lands in South Central China. It is usually harvested at the end of summer.

Therapeutic usage 
The herb is used to as a medicine to treat cancer. However, there have been multiple reports that patients who were treated with the herb struggled with inflammation and infection.

They are also used to treat hepatitis, appendicitis, pulmonary abscess, and ascites due to cirrhosis.

References

Bibliography 

 

barbata
Flora of Asia
Plants used in traditional Chinese medicine